In enzymology, a 1,2-dihydroxy-6-methylcyclohexa-3,5-dienecarboxylate dehydrogenase is an enzyme that catalyzes the chemical reaction

1,2-dihydroxy-6-methylcyclohexa-3,5-dienecarboxylate + NAD  3-methylcatechol + NADH + CO

Thus, the two substrates of this enzyme are 1,2-dihydroxy-6-methylcyclohexa-3,5-dienecarboxylate and NAD, whereas its 3 products are 3-methylcatechol, NADH, and CO.

This enzyme belongs to the family of oxidoreductases, specifically those acting on the CH-CH group of donor with NAD+ or NADP+ as acceptor.  The systematic name of this enzyme class is 1,2-dihydroxy-6-methylcyclohexa-3,5-dienecarboxylate:NAD+ oxidoreductase (decarboxylating). This enzyme participates in toluene and xylene degradation.

References

 

EC 1.3.1
NADH-dependent enzymes
Enzymes of unknown structure